

List

See also 

 Nerella Venu Madhav
 Mimicry Srinivos

References

 India
Lists of Indian people
National symbols of India